Simon Emmett is an English portrait photographer based in London, mostly known for his celebrity portraits and beauty photography.

Emmett was born in England in 1969. Emmett does mainly portrait, celebrity, beauty, and fashion photography. After school he attended Watford College (now West Herts College) in Watford.

Emmett has photographed for publications such as British GQ, Vogue Russia, Harper's Bazaar, Velvet Magazine, L'Officiel Magazine, Grazie Magazine, Sunday Times Magazine, American Vogue, British Vogue, French Vogue, German Vogue, Australian Vogue, Numéro, The New York Times, Interview, and Vibe.

He has photographed celebrities such as Megan Fox, Mickey Rourke, Orlando Bloom, Keira Knightley, Jay-Z, Kanye West, Justin Timberlake, Cameron Diaz, Lily Allen, Sacha Baron Cohen, Dita Von Teese, Led Zeppelin, Jeremy Irons, Josh Brolin, Tony Bennett, Pharrell Williams, Sienna Miller, Gordon Ramsay, Robbie Williams, Morrissey, John Galliano, Steve Coogan, Daniel Craig, Beyoncé, Kylie Minogue, Bob Geldof, Reckless and Keane.

He has shot advertisements for MAC Cosmetics, L'Oréal, CoverGirl, Lancaster, and Paco Rabanne

References

External links 
 
 Camilla Lowther Management

Photographers from London
Living people
1969 births